The Province of Brabant was a province in Belgium from 1830 to 1995. It was created in 1815 as South Brabant, part of the United Kingdom of the Netherlands. In 1995, it was split into the Dutch-speaking Flemish Brabant, the French-speaking Walloon Brabant and the bilingual Brussels-Capital Region.

History

United Kingdom of the Netherlands
After the defeat of Napoleon in 1815, the United Kingdom of the Netherlands was created at the Congress of Vienna, consisting of territories which had been added to France by Napoleon: the former Dutch Republic and the Southern Netherlands. In the newly created kingdom, the former French département of Dyle became the new province of South Brabant, distinguishing it from Central Brabant (later Antwerp province); and from North Brabant (now part of the Netherlands), all named after the former Duchy of Brabant.

The provincial governors during this time were:
 1815–1818: François Joseph Charles Marie de Mercy-Argenteau
 1818–1823: Philippe d'Arschot Schoonhoven
 1823–1828: Leonard du Bus de Gisignies
 1828–1830: Hyacinthe van der Fosse

Belgium

After the Belgian Revolution of 1830, the Southern Netherlands (including South and Central Brabant) became independent as Belgium and later also Luxembourg. The province was then renamed simply Brabant and became the central province of Belgium, with its capital city Brussels. The province contained three arrondissements: Brussels, Leuven and Nivelles.

In 1961–1963, the language border was established, from which the province was divided into a Dutch-speaking region, a French-speaking region and the bilingual Brussels. The Brussels arrondissement was split to this end. In 1989, Brussels-Capital Region was created, but the region was still part of the province of Brabant. In 1995, the province of Brabant was split into the Dutch-speaking Flemish Brabant, the French-speaking Walloon Brabant and the bilingual Brussels-Capital Region. The Brussels-Capital Region exercises the powers of a Province on its own territory.

Demographics
As comparison, the current two provinces of Brabant, together with Brussels, had 2,621,275 inhabitants in January 2011.

Number of inhabitants x 1000

 Source: NIS
 1806 till 1970: census
 1980 and 1990: number of inhabitants on 1 January
 1994: number on 31 December

See also

 State reform in Belgium
 Duchy of Brabant

References

Former provinces of Belgium
Brabant